Egge is a village in the municipality of Gloppen in Sogn og Fjordane county, Norway. The village sits at the base of the mountain Eggenipa.

References

Villages in Vestland